William Silver Frith (1850–1924) was a British sculptor.

Frith graduated from the Lambeth School of Art and the Royal Academy Schools, and became assistant to Jules Dalou.  By 1880 Frith had succeeded Dalou as master at the newly formed South London Technical Art School (which replaced Lambeth School of Art and is now called City and Guilds of London Art School). There he became a guiding force to several of the figures in the New Sculpture school, including F. W. Pomeroy, C. J. Allen, and George Frampton.

In his own work he was primarily an architectural sculptor, often with architect Sir Aston Webb.

His work includes:

 
 figures of Justice, Truth, Patience and Plenty, Victoria Law Courts, Birmingham (1885)
 the Metropolitan Life Assurance Company building in Moorgate, London
 fountain figures at Christ's Hospital, Horsham, Sussex, England
 Imperial College, South Kensington
 statues of British sculptors Grinling Gibbons and John Bacon for the Victoria and Albert Museum (1899–1909)
 front entrance portico design and sculptures (as well as assorted other elements of the building decoration) for Two Temple Place, London, England
 the Hugh de Boves and Hugh of Faringdon memorials, in the ruined chapter house of Reading Abbey (1911)

References 

1850 births
1924 deaths
Alumni of the Lambeth School of Art
British architectural sculptors
20th-century British sculptors
19th-century British sculptors
British male sculptors
19th-century British male artists
20th-century British male artists